Webster is an unincorporated community in Dodge County, Nebraska, United States.

History
A post office was established at Webster in 1871, and remained in operation until it was discontinued in 1902.

References

Unincorporated communities in Dodge County, Nebraska
Unincorporated communities in Nebraska